"What You Know" is a song by Northern Irish band Two Door Cinema Club from their debut studio album, Tourist History (2010). It was released on 7 February 2011 as the album's fifth and final single. The song was written by Alex Trimble, Kevin Baird, and Sam Halliday and was produced by Eliot James. The song peaked at number 64 on the UK Singles Chart. "What You Know" was used for the 2012 Microsoft Outlook.com online adverts.

Music video
The music video for "What You Know" premiered on 11 January 2011. The video was directed by Lope Serrano of the Barcelona-based creative collective and directors known as Canada and features female Spanish dancers. The dancers' names are: Patricia Suárez, Laia Santanach, Naya Monzón, Alicia Atienza, Adriana Barrabés, Marina Cardona.

Use in popular culture
This song is featured on Telkomsel Loop TV commercials in Indonesia starting in July 2014, followed by Indomie instant noodles to promote two new flavors from new Kuliner Indonesia range, Dendeng Balado and Soto Lamongan, in September that year.

Track listing
Digital download
"What You Know" – 3:09

Credits and personnel
Alex Trimble – lead vocals, rhythm guitar 
Sam Halliday – lead guitar
Kevin Baird – bass guitar 
Benjamin Thompson – drums
Elliot James – production

Charts

Certifications

Release history

References

2010 songs
2011 singles
Kitsuné singles
Two Door Cinema Club songs
Synth-pop songs